Jorge Aguilar and Sergio Galdós were the defending champion, but decided not to compete.

František Čermák and Michail Elgin won the title, defeating Martín Alund and Guillermo Durán in the final, 4–6, 6–3, [10–8].

Seeds

Draw

Draw

References
 Main Draw

Visit Panama Cup - Doubles
2014 Doubles